Dele is a Nigerian given name and surname of Yoruba meaning "come home" It is also a diminutive of names such as Ayodele (joy comes home), Akindele (warrior comes home), Oladele (wealth comes home), Oludele (God/my lord comes home), Adedele (crown/royalty comes home), etc.

Given name
People with the given name Dele include:
 Dele Adebola (born 1975), Nigerian footballer
 Dele Adeleye (born 1988), Nigerian footballer
 Dele Aiyenugba (born 1983), Nigerian footballer
 Dele Ajiboye (born 1990), Nigerian footballer
 Dele Alli (born 1996), English footballer
 Dele Charley (1948–1993), Sierra Leonean writer and playwright
 Dele Joseph Ezeoba (born 1958), Nigerian Navy admiral 
 Dele Giwa (1947-1986), Nigerian journalist
 Dele Jegede (born 1945), Nigerian-American painter, art historian, cartoonist, curator, and teacher
 Dele Momodu (born 1960), Nigerian journalist, publisher, businessman, and motivational speaker
 Dele Odule (born, 1961), Nigerian actor
 Dele Olaoye (born 1982), Nigerian footballer
 Dele Olojede (born 1961), Nigerian Pulitzer Prize-winning journalist
 Dele Olorundare (born 1992), Nigerian footballer
 Dele Sosimi (born 1963), Nigerian-British musician

Surname
People with the surname Dele include:
 Bison Dele (1969-2002), American professional basketball player
 Gilbert Delé (born 1964), French professional boxer.
 Jonathan Dele (born 1946), Nigerian boxer of the 1960s and '70s

References

African masculine given names
Nigerian names
Yoruba given names